Dominic Rau (born 29 November 1990) is a German footballer who most recently played for SC Hessen Dreieich.

Career

Bayern Alzenau
On 27 September 2019 it was confirmed, that Rau had signed with FC Bayern Alzenau. In January 2020 29-year old Rau confirmed, that he would retire to complete his education as a police officer.

References

External links

Dominic Rau at Kicker

1990 births
Living people
German footballers
FC Erzgebirge Aue players
Hallescher FC players
1. FC Saarbrücken players
SC Hessen Dreieich players
2. Bundesliga players
3. Liga players
Regionalliga players
Association football central defenders